Corumbataia is a genus of armored catfishes native to South America where they are only known from Brazil.

Species
There are currently six recognized species in this genus:
 Corumbataia britskii Ferreira & Ribeiro, 2007
 Corumbataia cuestae Britski, 1997
 Corumbataia liliai Silva & Roxo & Souza & Oliveira, 2018
 Corumbataia lucianoi Silva & Roxo & Souza & Oliveira, 2018
 Corumbataia tocantinensis Britski, 1997
 Corumbataia veadeiros Carvalho, 2008

Description
These species range in size from about 2.7–3.8 centimetres (1.1–1.5 in) SL.

C. cuestae and C. tocantinensis were described to be differentiated by counts of premaxillary and dentary teeth. However, they also differ in color pattern, as the unbranched caudal fin rays of C. britskii and C. tocantinensis lack the striped pattern present in C. cuestae.

Corumbataia species exhibit sexual dimorphism. Males differ from females by presenting a developed urogenital papillae posterior to the anus, a skin fold at the dorsal portion of the pelvic fin spine, and a much longer pelvic fin spine that extends over the first anal fin ray. In C. britskii, males also differ from females by having four white blotches on the caudal fin, two at the dorsal lobe and two at the ventral lobe. Females, on the other hand, present only two white blotches, one on each lobe.

References

Otothyrinae
Fish of South America
Taxa named by Heraldo Antonio Britski
Fauna of Brazil
Catfish genera
Freshwater fish genera